Badminton at the 2017 Summer Deaflympics took place at the Bafra Sports Hall.

Medal summary

Medalists

Results

Mixed team

Group A

Group B

Group C

Group D

Knockout

References

External links
 Badminton

2017 Summer Deaflympics
Deaflympics